The Beiderbecke Connection is a four-part British television serial written by Alan Plater and broadcast in 1988. It is the third and final part of The Beiderbecke Trilogy and stars James Bolam and Barbara Flynn as schoolteachers Trevor Chaplin and Jill Swinburne. Now with a baby in tow, Jill and Trevor are asked by Big Al to look after a refugee called "Ivan".

Plot
Trevor Chaplin teaches woodwork and likes to listen to jazz. Jill Swinburne teaches English and wants to help save the planet. They live together and just want a quiet life. Since their last adventure in The Beiderbecke Tapes, Jill and Trevor have a child - Firstborn. Big Al asks them to put up a friend of his and they agree. But when Ivan arrives, they find he speaks no English but thinks that "Bix is cool". Meetings with criminals, smuggling people over the border, fighting for the right to education even when it's against the rules. These and other adventures are played out to a soundtrack of jazz music in the style of Bix Beiderbecke performed by Frank Ricotti with Kenny Baker as featured cornet soloist.

Episodes
As with The Beiderbecke Affair, the four episodes are titled by incipit, that is, the title is simply the first spoken words heard in each episode.

"Oh Look, It's Average-Sized Trevor Chaplin" - Jill & Trevor have produced Firstborn. They need a babysitter and get a refugee. Head for the border.
"Hello Sir, Hello Miss" - The refugee is back from the border. Life goes on. Big Al and Little Norm make other plans. Trevor makes a stand.
"Is He the Lodger?" - A face from the past. Criminals in the spare bed. The police take an interest. A day at the seaside.
"What Do We Have on Hockey Sticks?" - Rocking the world on its axis. But life goes on for those that hear the music.

Production

Filming locations
Jill's house- 15 Hillview Avenue, Chapel Allerton, Leeds
San Quentin High- Foxwood School, Seacroft, Leeds
The bowling green- The Recreation Ground, Wortley, Leeds
The Archer Street shopping precinct- The area surrounding the Bond Street Precinct (now Leeds Shopping Plaza), Bond Street and Albion Street, Leeds city centre.
Highfield Avenue, Wortley.
Parish church of St Margarets, Horsforth, Leeds.
Big Al phones Trevor and Jill from the former BT phone box opposite 72A Hall Lane, Leeds LS12 2BL.  The area has been considerably redeveloped but the outline of the cross on the funeral director's opposite is still visible, confirming the location.

References

External links
 

1980s British comedy-drama television series
1988 British television series debuts
1988 British television series endings
English-language television shows
ITV comedy-dramas
Television series by ITV Studios
Television series by Yorkshire Television
Television shows set in Leeds
Television shows set in Yorkshire